Mario Pavone (November 11, 1940 – May 15, 2021) was an American jazz bassist, composer and bandleader.  Jazz critic Kevin Whitehead offers that Pavone was not only "great bass player [but also a] big-hearted mensch."

Early life
Pavone was born in Waterbury, Connecticut. Pavone attended B. W. Tinker grammar school, Leavenworth High School, and the University of Connecticut at Storrs, where he graduated with a B.S. in engineering. When his Town Plot neighbor, world-renowned guitarist Joe Diorio, recognized him as an unrealized musician Mario was inspired to take up the bass. Primarily self-taught, he was a natural on his instrument. Pavone began playing bass soon after witnessing John Coltrane at the Village Vanguard in 1961.

Career
Pavone's career took off in the 1960s when he toured Europe. Also in the 1960s, he was involved in the jazz loft era, playing in jam sessions nightly in New York City.

He began performing in 1965.  The New Haven-based Creative Musicians Improvising Forum (CMIF) was founded in 1975 by Pavone, Wadada Leo Smith, and Gerry Hemingway, influenced by Chicago's Association for the Advancement of Creative Musicians. His venture into composition began here. He was a member of Paul Bley's trio during 1968–72 and Bill Dixon's trio during the 1980s. He also performed with Barry Altschul, Smith, and Hemingway. 

In 1979 Pavone recorded his first album as a leader. He co-led a group with Anthony Braxton in the early 1990s, with Braxton on piano rather than his usual saxophones. In 1980 he began an 18-year musical relationship with saxophonist Thomas Chapin. With drummer Michael Sarin, the group recorded seven albums for Knitting Factory Records, which also released an eight-CD box set of these albums plus a live recording following Chapin's death in 1998.

His groups have included Matt Wilson, Gerald Cleaver, Peter Madsen, Joshua Redman, Tony Malaby, Dave Douglas, Steven Bernstein, George Schuller, Craig Taborn, and Jimmy Greene. Over 40 recordings and several films document his compositions and performances.

Death
Pavone died from carcinoid cancer in Madeira Beach, Florida, on May 15, 2021, aged 80.

Awards and honors
 Doris Duke Foundation composer’s grant (2010)

Discography

As leader
 Digit (Alacra, 1979)
 Shodo (Alacra, 1981)
 Sharpeville (Alacra, 1988)
 Toulon Days (New World/CounterCurrents, 1992)
 Song for (Septet) (New World/CounterCurrents, 1994)
 Dancers Tales (Knitting Factory, 1997)
 Totem Blues (Knitting Factory, 2000)
 Remembering Thomas (Knitting Factory, 1999)
 Motion Poetry (Playscape, 2000)
 OpEd (Playscape, 2001)
 Mythos (Playscape, 2002)
 Orange (Playscape, 2003)
 Boom (Playscape, 2004)
 Deez to Blues (Playscape, 2006)
 Ancestors (Playscape, 2008)
 Trio Arc (Playscape, 2008)
 Arc Suite T/Pi T/Po (Playscape, 2010)
 Arc Trio (Playscape, 2013)
 Street Songs (Playscape, 2014)
 Blue Dialect (Clean Feed, 2015)
 Chrome (Playscape, 2017)
 Vertical (Clean Feed, 2017)
 Philosophy (Clean Feed, 2019)
Isabella (Clean Feed, 2021)
Blue Vertical (Out of Your Head, 2021)

As sideman
With Anthony Braxton
 Duets (1993) (Music & Arts, 1993)
 Seven Standards 1995 (Knitting Factory, 1995)
 Six Standards (Quintet) 1996 (Splasc(H), 2004)

With Thomas Chapin
 The Bell of the Heart (Alacra, 1981)
 Third Force (Knitting Factory, 1991)
 Anima (Knitting Factory, 1992)
 Insomnia (Knitting Factory, 1993)
 Menagerie Dreams (Knitting Factory, 1995)
 Haywire (Knitting Factory, 1996)
 Sky Piece (Knitting Factory, 1997)
 Night Bird Song (Knitting Factory, 1999)
 Ride (Playscape, 2006)

With Bill Dixon
 November 1981 (Soul Note, 1982)
 Thoughts (Soul Note, 1987)
 Son of Sisyphus (Soul Note, 1990)

With others
 Paul Bley, Paul Bley Trio (Radio Canada, 1969)
 Bobby Naughton, Understanding (Otic, 1972)
 Michael Pavone, Trio (Playscape, 2001)
 Annette Peacock & Paul Bley, Dual Unity (Freedom, 1972)
 Alan Silva, Skillfullness (ESP Disk, 1969)
 Patty Waters, Live (Blank Forms 2019)
 Patty Waters, An Evening in Houston (Clean Feed, 2020)

References

External links
 Official site
 Mario Pavone discography
 

1940 births
2021 deaths
People from Waterbury, Connecticut
20th-century American male musicians
American male jazz musicians
Jazz musicians from Connecticut
Knitting Factory Records artists
Clean Feed Records artists